Majdabad-e Now (also Romanized as Majdābād-e Now; also known as Majābād, Mujdābād, and Mujdābād Nau) is a village in Farmahin Rural District, in the Central District of Farahan County, Markazi Province, Iran. At the 2006 census, its population was 63, in 25 families.

References 

Populated places in Farahan County